Joseph Brennen Hugill (born 19 October 2003) is an English footballer who plays as a centre-forward for Altrincham, on loan from  club Manchester United.

Early life
Born in Durham, England, Hugill started his career with Newcastle United, where he spent a year, before joining rivals Sunderland.

Club career

Manchester United
Hugill signed with Premier League side Manchester United on 1 July 2020, with the Manchester club reportedly having fought off competition from Arsenal and Tottenham Hotspur, among others, for his signature. His career in Manchester started brightly, with his most notable performance coming against Liverpool U23, where he scored four goals in a 6–3 win. In doing so, he became only the second player in Manchester United history to score four in one game against Liverpool, after Steve Jones in a reserve game in 1977.

Hugill was called up to train with the Manchester United first team for 2021–22 pre-season preparation. He featured in friendly games against Derby County and Queens Park Rangers.

He signed a new contract in July 2021.

On 1 February 2023, Hugill was one of three Manchester United youngsters to join National League club Altrincham on loan for the remainder of the season. This marked the start of a new scheme that would see the youngsters continue to train and play for Manchester United's academy players, while also earning senior experience playing for their loan club.

International career
Hugill was called up to the England national under-18 football team in 2020.

Career statistics

Honours
Manchester United U18
FA Youth Cup: 2021–22

References

2003 births
Living people
English footballers
Association football forwards
Newcastle United F.C. players
Sunderland A.F.C. players
Manchester United F.C. players
Altrincham F.C. players